Husain Dalwai, (born 15 February 1943) is a politician from Indian National Congress party. 

Dalwai is a trade unionist, journalist and writer by profession. He represented Congress Party in Maharashtra Legislative Council from 1998 to 2003. During this term, he was also a minister from Oct 1999 to March 2001. In June 2010 he was again elected to Maharashtra Legislative Council from Indian National Congress; his term lasted until August 2011. He was elected from Maharashtra to the Rajya Sabha, the upper house of the Parliament from 2011 to 2014. He was elected to Rajya Sabha for second term from Maharashtra, from April 2014 to April 2020.

His brother was Hamid Dalwai.

Positions held
In Parliament, Mr. Dalwai served on the following committees:
 Member, Committee on Rural Development (Aug. 2011- Aug. 2012) 
 Member, Central Advisory Committee for the National Cadet Corps (Dec. 2011 - Dec. 2013) 
 Member, Committee on Railways (Aug. 2012 - May 2014) 
 Member, Committee on Petitions April 2014 (May 2013 - Sept. 2014)
 Member, Committee on Urban Development (Sept. 2014 – present)
 Member, Committee on Government Assurances (Sept. 2014 – present)

External links
 Profile on Rajya Sabha website

References

1943 births
Living people
Indian National Congress politicians from Maharashtra
Konkani Muslims
Indian Sunni Muslims
Rajya Sabha members from Maharashtra
Members of the Maharashtra Legislative Council
Marathi politicians
People from Ratnagiri district